The 2022 Arab Futsal Cup hosted by the Saudi city of Dammam was the sixth edition of the Arab Futsal Cup between 20 and 28 June 2022.
Ten teams took part: Saudi Arabia, Morocco, Palestine, Iraq, Kuwait, Mauritania, Egypt, Libya, Algeria and Somalia.

Morocco defeated Iraq 3–0 in the final to win their second title.

Qualification 
The following ten teams qualified for the final tournament.

Venue

Squads

Group stage
The teams are divided into three groups.

Group 1

Group 2

Group 3

Ranking of third-placed teams

Knockout stage

Bracket

Quarter-finals

Semi-finals

Final

Honors 

Best Player: Soufiane El Mesrar - 
Best Goalkeeper: Zaher Hadi - 
Top Goal Scorer: Abdulrahman Al Taweel (9) - 
Fair Play Award:

Tournament ranking 
Per statistical convention in football, matches decided in extra time are counted as wins and losses, while matches decided by penalty shoot-out are counted as draws.

References

External links

2022
2022 in futsal
2022 in African football
Arab
June 2022 sports events in Asia
2022 in Saudi Arabian sport